John E. Kerrigan (October 1, 1908 – May 2, 1987) was the acting Mayor of Boston in 1945 after then-Mayor Maurice J. Tobin became Governor of Massachusetts.

Biography
Kerrigan was born on October 1, 1908, and was a graduate of South Boston High School. He began serving on the Boston City Council in 1933. He was council president in 1938, 1944, and 1945. He also served one term in the Massachusetts Senate, 1939–1941.

As president of the Council in 1945, Kerrigan became acting Mayor of Boston upon the inauguration of Maurice J. Tobin, who had been mayor since 1938, as governor. Initially with limited authority, Kerrigan was given full mayoral powers by the Massachusetts legislature on January 25, 1945. He was defeated in the November 1945 mayoral election by James Michael Curley.  Kerrigan served as acting mayor into January 1946, until Curley was inaugurated.

Kerrigan retired from the City Council in 1973, having served a total of 15 terms, non-consecutively. He died on May 2, 1987, of cardiac arrest at Boston City Hospital. He had never married.

See also
 1939 Massachusetts legislature
 Timeline of Boston, 1930s–1940s

References

External links
 Kerrigan election records at ourcampaigns.com
 Photo of Kerrigan via Northeastern University
 

1908 births
1987 deaths
Mayors of Boston
Massachusetts state senators
Boston City Council members
20th century in Boston
People from South Boston
20th-century American politicians
South Boston High School alumni